Admiral's Arms is a French five-piece band from Paris, composed of Hendrick Gorecki, Matthew Rigg, James Ryan, Gary Royant and Mus Bennacer. The band is now managed by Jake Schultz, the bass player of Norma Jean.

The band has released three records: Cords & Colts (2008), Stories Are Told (2009), and Chapters Unfold (2012). They have played at the prestigious Vans Warped Tour and Groezrock Festivals, also touring the U.S. and Europe with The Chariot, Cancer Bats, Helmet, Glassjaw and more. On Stories Are Told, Bring Me the Horizon frontman Oliver Sykes appears on a track called "Dawn of the New Age".

External links
 
 Admiral's Arms Bandcamp Profile
 Admiral's Arms Profile - Monster Energy Website

Musical quintets
Musical groups from Paris
Post-hardcore groups
French metalcore musical groups
Mathcore musical groups